Vedel is a surname. Notable people with the surname include:

Anders Sørensen Vedel (1542–1616), priest and historian born in Vejle, Denmark
Artemy Vedel (1767–1808), 18th century Ukrainian composer
Dominique Honoré Antoine Vedel (1771–1848), French general
Georges Vedel (1910–2002), French public law professor from Auch, France
Kristian Solmer Vedel (1923–2003), Danish industrial designer and part of the Scandinavian Design movement
Alexandre-Louis Poulet, called Vedel, French dramatist